DC/Wildstorm: DreamWar is a six-issue comic book limited series writer by Keith Giffen, drawn by Lee Garbett and published by DC Comics. The series is a crossover between the DC and Wildstorm Universes.

Synopsis

In the series, DC characters arrive in the big Wildstorm universe and soon get into major brawls. After some fatalities, both sides come to realize something has gone horribly wrong---their minds are being played with.

Collected editions
The series was collected into a trade paperback.

Notes

References

Comics by Keith Giffen
Crossover comics